New Zealand competed at the 2016 Summer Paralympics in Rio de Janeiro, Brazil, from 7 to 18 September 2016. It was the nation's thirteenth appearance at the Summer Paralympics, having made its debut in 1968 and appeared in every edition since.

The 31-member delegation collected 21 medals at the Games: nine gold, five silver and seven bronze. This was the second-largest number of medals won by New Zealand behind the 1984 Games, while the number of gold medals achieved equalling the record of nine achieved at the 1996 Games. The medals won exceeded High Performance Sport New Zealand's target of 18 medals overall, but fell short of the second target of 12 gold medals. Swimming and athletics dominated the medal tally with ten and nine medals respectively; the remaining two medals were both achieved in cycling.

Swimmer Sophie Pascoe achieved three gold medals and two silver medals, taking her total medal haul to nine golds and six silvers and overtaking Eve Rimmer to become New Zealand's most decorated Paralympian. Her silver medal in the 50 m freestyle S10 is New Zealand's 200th overall Paralympic medal. Fellow swimmers Mary Fisher, Nikita Howarth and Cameron Leslie won single gold medals, with Leslie completing a hat-trick with his third consecutive gold medal in the 150 m individual medley SM4. Sprinter Liam Malone won gold medals in the 200 m and 400 m T44 events, while fellow athlete Anna Grimaldi won the gold medal in the long jump T47.

Medallists
Unless otherwise stated, all dates and times are in Brasília time (UTC−3), fifteen hours behind New Zealand Standard Time (UTC+12).

| width="78%" align="left" valign="top" |

|style="text-align:left;width:22%;vertical-align:top;"|

Delegation

Paralympics New Zealand confirmed a team of 29 athletes, 17 male and 14 female, and two cycling pilots (both female) to compete in six sports. Ten competitors had attended previous Paralympic games, with the remaining 21 made their Paralympics debut. Returning gold medallists included swimmers Mary Fisher, Cameron Leslie and Sophie Pascoe, sports shooter Michael Johnson, and tandem cycling pilot Laura Thompson. Javelin thrower Holly Robinson, ranked number one in the world entering the games, was selected as the country's flagbearer for the opening ceremony.

The median age of the New Zealand delegation was 25 years. Fifteen-year-old swimmer Tupou Neiufi was New Zealand's youngest competitor, while 58-year-old sailor Chris Sharp was the oldest competitor.

Support staff and officials
Retired wheelchair racer Ben Lucas was appointed New Zealand's chef de mission for the 2016 Paralympic Games. Lucas had previously represented New Zealand as an athlete at the 1994 Commonwealth Games, and the 1996 and 2000 Summer Paralympics.

The New Zealand delegation also included Doping Control Officer Daniel Mulholland from Upper Hutt.  He was the only representative from Drug Free Sport NZ in Rio.

Funding 
High Performance Sport New Zealand (HPSNZ) invested $12.7 million in Paralympic sports and athletes over the 2013–16 funding cycle, of which $7.5 million was core funding to national sports organisations and Paralympics New Zealand (PNZ) while the remaining $5.2 million was mainly in the form of grants and tertiary scholarships to individual athletes. These totals include funding for non-Paralympic events such as world championships as well as the 2014 Winter Paralympics.

Media coverage 
Attitude Pictures and Television New Zealand hold the New Zealand coverage rights for the 2016 Paralympics. Live and delayed coverage screened on TVNZ's Duke channel, with a daily highlights show on TV One and on-demand highlights through TVNZ on Demand and Attitude Live.

Athletics 

New Zealand achieved two silver medals at the 2015 IPC Athletics World Championships, earning the nation two qualification slots at the Rio Paralympics.

Paralympics New Zealand confirmed a team of six track and field athletes on 23 May 2016, with an additional two athletes named on 7 July 2016.

Track

Field

Canoeing

New Zealand was awarded a slot in the para-canoe competitionas a result of the IPC reallocating slots from the banned Russian delegation.

Cycling 

With one pathway for qualification being one highest ranked NPCs on the UCI Para-Cycling male and female Nations Ranking Lists on 31 December 2014, New Zealand qualified for the 2016 Summer Paralympics in Rio, assuming they continued to meet all other eligibility requirements. Paralympics New Zealand confirmed seven cyclists, including two sighted pilots, on 9 May 2016. The team includes sighted pilot Laura Thompson, who won three medals with Phillipa Gray in 2012, and 2008 athletics silver medallist turned cyclist Kate Horan. An eighth cyclist, Fraser Sharp, was added to the team on 30 August 2016 as a result of the IPC reallocating slots from the banned Russian delegation.

Men
Road

Track

Women
Road

Track

Sailing 

One pathway for qualifying for Rio involved having a boat have top seven finish at the 2015 Combined World Championships in a medal event where the country had nor already qualified through via the 2014 IFDS Sailing World Championships. New Zealand qualified for the 2016 Games under this criterion in the Sonar event with an eighth-place finish overall and the third country who had not qualified via the 2014 Championships. They qualified a second boat in the SKUD 18 event with a twelfth-place finish overall and the fourth country who had not qualified via the 2014 Championships.  The boat was crewed by Tim Dempsey and Gemma Fletcher.

Paralympics New Zealand announce the first three sailors to compete in the Sonar keelboat on 3 March 2016.

Shooting 

The first opportunity to qualify for shooting at the Rio Games took place at the 2014 IPC Shooting World Championships in Suhl. Shooters earned spots for their NPC.  New Zealand earned a qualifying spot at this competition  in the R5 – 10m Air Rifle Prone Mixed SH2  event as a result of the performance of Michael Johnson.

The third opportunity for direct qualification for shooters to the Rio Paralympics took place at the 2015 IPC IPC Shooting World Cup in Sydney, Australia.  At this competition, Jason Eales earned a qualifying spot for their country in the R5- Mixed 10m Air Rifle Prone SH2  event.

The last direct qualifying event for Rio in shooting took place at the 2015 IPC Shooting World Cup in Fort Benning in November. Greg Reid earned a qualifying spot for their country at this competition in the R3 Mixed 10m Air Rifle Prone SH1 event.

Paralympics New Zealand confirmed Michael Johnson, Jason Eales and Greg Reid to compete at the Games on 14 June 2016.

Swimming 

Swimming got a bump in funding through their NPC and the national swimming federation to help with New Zealand swimming readiness in Rio.

The top two swimmers in each event at the 2015 IPC Swimming World Championships in Glasgow earned a qualification slot for their NPC at the 2016 Summer Paralympics. Five swimmers earned fourteen gold and silver medals for New Zealand, earning the nation five qualification slots.

Paralympics New Zealand confirmed a team of seven swimmers on 5 May 2016. The team includes three 2012 gold medalists: Mary Fisher, Cameron Leslie and Sophie Pascoe. On 13 May 2016, an eighth swimmer, Hamish McLean, was added to the team. Tupou Neiufi was added to the team on 9 August 2016 after Bryall McPherson withdrew from participation due to illness and injury.

Men

Women

See also
New Zealand at the 2016 Summer Olympics

References 

Nations at the 2016 Summer Paralympics
2016
2016 in New Zealand sport